HMS C16 was one of 38 C-class submarines built for the Royal Navy in the first decade of the 20th century. The boat survived the First World War and was sold for scrap in 1922.

Design and description
The C class was essentially a repeat of the preceding B class, albeit with better performance underwater. They displaced  on the surface and  submerged. The C-class submarines had a crew of two officers and fourteen ratings.

For surface running, the boats were powered by a single 16-cylinder  Vickers petrol engine that drove one propeller shaft. When submerged the propeller was driven by a  electric motor. They could reach  on the surface and  underwater.

The boats were armed with two 18-inch (45 cm) torpedo tubes in the bow. They could carry a pair of reload torpedoes, but generally did not as they would have to remove an equal weight of fuel in compensation.

Construction and career
C16 was built by Vickers at their Barrow-in-Furness shipyard, laid down on 14 December 1906 and was commissioned on 5 June 1908. C16 was undamaged and participated in the Lord Mayor's Pageant (17-24 July 1909). A Mate – Samuel Anderson – was fired through a torpedo tube to try to escape, but unfortunately drowned. The captain – Lieutenant Harold Boase – tried to flood the boat in an effort to escape through the fore hatch, but the fender jammed the hatch, so the crew was trapped. The escape attempts were recorded by the commanding officer, and were found corked in a bottle found lying near him when the hull was salvaged. All the crew of C16 died. C16 was salvaged and recommissioned. C16 was finally sold on 12 August 1922.

Notes

References

External links
 HMS C16 pages at MaritimeQuest
 HMS C16 Roll of Honour
 'Submarine losses 1904 to present day' - Royal Navy Submarine Museum

References
 

 

Ships built in Barrow-in-Furness
British C-class submarines
Royal Navy ship names
Shipwrecks in the North Sea
World War I shipwrecks in the North Sea
Friendly fire incidents of World War I
British submarine accidents
Submarines sunk in collisions
1908 ships
Maritime incidents in 1909
Maritime incidents in 1917
1917 disasters in the United Kingdom
Warships lost with all hands